Contomastix serrana is a species of teiid lizard endemic to Argentina.

References

serrana
Reptiles of Argentina
Endemic fauna of Argentina
Reptiles described in 1991
Taxa named by José Miguel Alfredo María Cei
Taxa named by Ricardo Amando Martori